Steinebach may refer to:

Steinebach an der Wied, a municipality in the Westerwald district, Rhineland-Palatinate, Germany
Steinebach/Sieg, a municipality in the district of Altenkirchen, Rhineland-Palatinate, Germany
Steinebach (Kinzig), a river of Hesse, Germany, tributary of the Kinzig